The 22705 / 22706 Tirupati – Jammu Tawi Humsafar Express is a completely 3-tier AC sleeper train of the Indian Railways connecting  in Andhra Pradesh and  in Jammu and Kashmir. It is currently being operated with 22705/22706 train numbers on a weekly basis.

Service

It averages 57 km/hr as 22705/Tirupati–Jammu Tawi HumSafar Express starts on Tuesday and covering 2985 km in 51 hrs 50 mins & 55 km/hr as 22706/Jammu Tawi–Tirupati Humsafar Express starts on Friday covering 2985 km in 53 hours 55 minutes.

Coaches 

The train is completely 3-tier AC LHB coach designed by Indian Railways with features of LED screen display to show information about stations and train speed. and will have announcement system as well. It also has vending machines for tea, coffee and milk, bio toilets in compartments and CCTV cameras.

Composition 
This train consists of sixteen AC III tier coaches, one pantry car and two generator power car coaches.

 13 AC III tier
 1 pantry car
 2 generator power car

Route & halts

Traction

This train is hauled by a WAP-7 locomotive of Lallaguda Electric Loco Shed on its entire journey.

See also 
 Howrah–Tirupati Humsafar Express
 Humsafar Express
 Jammu Tawi railway station
 Tirupati railway station

Notes

References

External links 
 22705/Tirupati - Jammu Tawi Humsafar Express India Rail Info
22706/Jammu Tawi - Tirupati Humsafar Express India Rail Info

Humsafar Express trains
Rail transport in Andhra Pradesh
Rail transport in Maharashtra
Rail transport in Madhya Pradesh
Rail transport in Delhi
Rail transport in Uttar Pradesh
Rail transport in Haryana
Rail transport in Punjab, India
Rail transport in Jammu and Kashmir
2017 establishments in India
Transport in Jammu
Transport in Tirupati
Railway services introduced in 2017